The Pilot Valley Playa is a playa and salt pan in Box Elder County, Utah and Elko County, Nevada that is a remnant of Pleistocene Lake Bonneville. Located in northwestern Utah and northeastern Nevada, the Pilot Valley Playa varies from five to ten miles wide, and is thirty miles long, with an elevation just above 4200 feet. It is bordered by the Pilot Mountains to the west, and the Silver Island Mountains to the southeast.

Springs are located in the alluvial fans at the base of the Pilot Range, and no water flows from the Silver Island Mountains.  Shallow groundwater (e.g., Bettridge Creek, with threatened Lahotan cutthroat trout) along the western edge of the playa varies from fresh water to brine over a distance of about 2,000 feet.

Pilot-Thousand Springs Watershed
The Pilot Valley Playa gets very little precipitation, experiences extreme temperatures and high wind speeds.

The playa is within the Pilot-Thousand Springs Watershed (USGS Huc 16020307), a  endorheic area.

References

Lines, Gregory C. (1979). Hydrology and Surface Morphology of the Bonneville Salt Flats and Pilot Valley Playa, Utah [Geological Survey Water-Supply Paper 2057]. Washington, D.C.:  United States Government Printing Office.

Great Salt Lake Desert
Salt flats of the United States
Landforms of Box Elder County, Utah
Landforms of Elko County, Nevada